Pteris ensiformis, the slender brake, silver lace fern, sword brake fern, or slender brake fern, is a plant species of the genus Pteris in the family Pteridaceae.  It is found in Asia and the Pacific.

Uses

Beverages
It is the most common ingredient of traditional herbal drinks in Taiwan containing different phenolic compounds : kaempferol 3-O-α-l-rhamnopyranoside-7-O-[α-d-apiofuranosyl-(1-2)-β-d-glucopyranoside], 7-O-caffeoylhydroxymaltol 3-O-β-d-glucopyranoside, hispidin 4-O-β-d-glucopyranoside, kaempferol 3-O-α-l-rhamnopyranoside-7-O-β-d-glucopyranoside, caffeic acid, 5-O-caffeoylquinic acid, 3,5-di-O-caffeoylquinic acid and 4,5-di-O-caffeoylquinic acid.

This plant is resistant to arsenic-induced oxidative stress.

Benzoyl-beta-D-glucoside, as well as pterosin sesquiterpenes can be found in P. ensiformis.

Cultivation
Pteris ensiformis is cultivated as an ornamental plant for tropical and subtropical climate gardens, and as a house plant.
Cultivars
 Pteris ensiformis 'Victoriae', the Victoria fern
 Pteris ensiformis 'Evergemiensis'

See also
 List of plants with edible leaves

References

ensiformis
Ferns of Asia
Flora of Asia
Flora of Australia
Plants described in 1768
Edible plants
Garden plants of Asia
Taxa named by Nicolaas Laurens Burman